Battle of Tanagra may refer to:

Battle of Tanagra (457 BC)
Battle of Tanagra (426 BC)